Jonathan Meier (born 11 November 1999) is a German professional footballer who plays as a left-back for Dynamo Dresden.

Career
Meier made his professional debut for Dynamo Dresden in the 3. Liga on 18 September 2020, starting in the away match against 1. FC Kaiserslautern.

On 14 August 2021, he joined Hansa Rostock on loan.

On 11 June 2022, Meier agreed to return to Dynamo Dresden on a two-year deal.

Career statistics

References

External links

 
 
 
 
 

1999 births
Living people
Footballers from Munich
German footballers
Association football fullbacks
2. Bundesliga players
3. Liga players
Regionalliga players
FC Bayern Munich II players
1. FSV Mainz 05 II players
1. FSV Mainz 05 players
Dynamo Dresden players
FC Hansa Rostock players